Joe Bertram III was an American politician from the Hawaiian island of Maui, who served as a member of the Hawaii House of Representatives. A Democrat, he represented the 11th district in south Maui, which includes the communities of Wailea-Makena and Kihei, his hometown. He was a candidate for reelection in 2010 but lost the general election to Republican nominee George R. Fontaine. He left office in January 2011.

Bertram moved to Hawaii at the age of nine and attended Kihei Elementary School, Seabury Hall in Makawao and Henry Perrine Baldwin High School in Wailuku.

A former member of the Green Party of Hawaii, Bertram ran unsuccessfully for the Maui County Council three times before mounting a campaign for the state legislature in 2006. In the primary election held on September 23, Bertram defeated fellow Democrat Stephen West by 61% to 39%. In the general election held November 7, he overcame the Republican nominee by a margin of 60% to 40% − a majority of 1,046 votes. He succeeded a Republican, Rep. Chris Halford, who had retired. Running for a second term in 2008, Bertram faced a primary challenge from Michael Gingerich but defeated him comfortably, taking 70% of the vote. He faced a Republican in the general election, defeating him by 57% to 43%.

In 2010, he faced both primary and general election opponents. In the Democratic primary election held on September 18, he defeated two opponents, garnering 44 percent of the vote. The second-placed finisher gained 28%. In the general election held on November 2, he was narrowly defeated by Republican nominee George Fontaine. Fontaine won 51.5% to Bertram's 48.5% – a margin of 172 votes.

Bertram married his partner of 30 years Albert Morairty in December 2013.

Bertram died on May 24, 2020, at the age of 63.

References

External links 
 Legislative homepage
 Profile at Project Vote Smart

1957 births
2020 deaths
Hawaii Greens
Democratic Party members of the Hawaii House of Representatives
LGBT state legislators in Hawaii
Gay politicians
People with HIV/AIDS